Alejandro Pedro San (1900 – death unknown) was a Dominican pitcher in the Negro leagues in the 1920s. 

A native of Monte Cristi, Dominican Republic, San made his Negro leagues debut in 1926 with the Cuban Stars (East). He went on to play two more seasons with the Stars through 1928.

References

External links
 and Seamheads

1900 births
Date of birth missing
Year of death missing
Place of death missing
Cuban Stars (East) players
Baseball pitchers
Dominican Republic baseball players
People from Monte Cristi Province